Thyrocopa kikaelekea, a species of flightless moth from Hawaii in genus Thyrocopa, was recently discovered by entomologists at University of California, Berkeley and described in a 2008 paper.

The forewing length is 8–11 mm. Adults are active during the day. However, these species may not be strictly diurnal, because they have been reported to be attracted to, and walking or jumping toward, lights at night. Adults are on wing at least from May to September.

The larva makes a silken tunnel under a rock and at the end of it a blind sack in which it pupates. The larvae possibly feed on windblown
debris of Sophora chrysophylla or grass such as Deschampsia.

References

Thyrocopa
Endemic moths of Hawaii
Moths described in 2008